Kyron Richard Horman (born September 9, 2002) is an American boy who disappeared from Skyline Elementary School in Portland, Oregon, on June 4, 2010, after attending a science fair. Local and state police, along with the Federal Bureau of Investigation (FBI), conducted an exhaustive search and launched a criminal investigation, but have not uncovered any significant information regarding the child's whereabouts. Horman's disappearance sparked the largest criminal investigation in Oregon history.

Background
Kyron Richard Horman was born September 9, 2002, in Portland, Oregon, to Desiree Young and Kaine Horman, an engineer for Intel. The couple divorced eight months into Young's pregnancy with Kyron, with Young citing irreconcilable differences. The two had been granted shared custody of Kyron until 2004, but when Young was diagnosed with kidney failure that required extensive medical intervention, Kaine took over full custody; notwithstanding this fact, Young still remained an active part of the child's upbringing.

In 2007, Kaine married Terri Moulton (born March 14, 1970), a substitute teacher originally from Roseburg. Kaine became romantically involved with Moulton around 2001 when he and Young were in the midst of divorcing. They married in 2007 while visiting Kauai, Hawaii. In December 2008, Moulton gave birth to a daughter, Kiara. Meanwhile, Kyron was a student at Skyline Elementary School near Forest Park.

Disappearance
On June 4, 2010, Kyron was taken to Skyline Elementary School by his stepmother Terri Horman (Moulton), who then stayed with him while he attended a science fair. Terri Horman stated that she left the school at around 8:45 a.m. and that she last remembered seeing Kyron walking down the hall to his first class. However, Kyron was never seen in his first class and was instead marked as absent that day.

Terri's statements to the police indicate that, after leaving the school at 8:45 a.m., she ran errands at two different Fred Meyer grocery stores until about 10:10 a.m. Between then and 11:39 a.m., she stated that she was driving her daughter around town in an attempt to use the motion of the vehicle to soothe the toddler's earache. Terri said that she then went to a local gym and exercised until about 12:40 p.m. By 1:21 p.m., she had arrived home and posted photos of Kyron at the science fair on Facebook.

At 3:30 p.m., Terri and her husband, Kaine, walked with their daughter, Kiara, to the bus stop to meet Kyron. The bus driver told them that the boy had not boarded the bus, and to call the school to ask his whereabouts. Terri did so, only to be informed by the school secretary that, as far as anyone there knew, Kyron had not been at school since early that day and that he had accordingly been marked absent. Realizing then that the boy was missing, the secretary called 9-1-1.

Initial search efforts
Law enforcement did not disclose their reasons for searching the area where they did, which included a search of the Sauvie Island Bridge.

On June 9, 2010, the Horman family, who had initially refused to speak with the media, released a statement: 

On June 12, around 300 trained rescuers were on the ground searching wooded areas near the school. The search for Kyron, which spanned ten days, was the largest in Oregon history and included over 1,300 searchers from Oregon, Washington and California. A reward posted for information leading to the discovery of Kyron, which was initially $25,000, expanded to $50,000 in late July 2010.

Legal proceedings
In late June 2010, in the midst of the search, Kaine was reportedly told by investigators that Terri had offered their landscaper, Rodolfo Sanchez, "a lot of money" to kill her husband. Sanchez testified in a deposition that Terri approached him to help kill her husband in January 2010, five months before Kyron's disappearance; in her own deposition, Terri denied the charge. Investigators convinced Sanchez to confront Terri while wearing an audio surveillance device, but they were unable to obtain any evidence and could not make an arrest. On June 28, Kaine filed for divorce and obtained a restraining order against Terri. The divorce was granted and Terri was eventually granted supervised visitation with her daughter.

During this time, Terri failed two separate polygraph examinations regarding Kyron's disappearance. In August 2010, it was announced that law enforcement were searching for an individual allegedly seen by two witnesses sitting inside Terri's truck outside Skyline Elementary the day of the disappearance. Bruce McCain, a former sheriff for the Multnomah County Sheriff's Office, told CBS News: "The identity of that second person, if he or she existed, could be critical in determining what happened to Kyron after 9 a.m. on June 4."

Meanwhile, in July 2010, a Multnomah County grand jury subpoenaed several friends of Terri, including DeDe Spicher, whom Young and Kaine described as having "been in close communication with Terri" and "providing Terri with support and advice that is not in the best interests of our son." According to law enforcement, Spicher was "extremely cooperative" and allowed a search of her property and car, as well as enduring three hours of questioning from detectives. On the day of Kyron's disappearance, Spicher abruptly left her work gardening for a homeowner on Germantown Road in Northwest Portland around 11:30 a.m., and returned around ninety minutes later. She also allegedly helped Terri purchase an untraceable cell phone. During this time, Spicher told journalists: "There's this horror that my friend is going through. If I thought for a second that she was capable of [foul play], I would not have been there. She would not have been my friend in the first place."

In early August 2010, both Young and Kaine were subpoenaed and testified during the grand jury hearing, as was the school principal of Skyline Elementary. In December 2010, it was reported by The Oregonian that the grand jury had yet to provide compelling evidence yielding a potential indictment. By November 29, 2010, search efforts in Kyron's case had cost an estimated $1.4 million, according to county commissioners, and yielded 4,257 tips.

In May 2017, it was reported by Portland station KGW that a secret grand jury panel continued to hear evidence in Kyron's disappearance, and had convened on multiple occasions. During the report, Kyron's case was described as still "active and ongoing." Two months later, in July 2017, law enforcement conducted further searches along Skyline Boulevard, but the searches yielded no results. In June 2018, Young posted on the official Find Kyron Horman Facebook page: "Stay tuned, something big is coming, I promise you."

Lawsuit against Terri Horman
On June 1, 2012, Young filed a civil lawsuit against Terri, claiming that she was "responsible for the disappearance of Kyron." The lawsuit attempted to prove that Terri had kidnapped Kyron on the day he disappeared. Young sought $10 million in damages. On August 15, 2012, a federal court judge denied a motion by Terri to delay the lawsuit.

In early October 2012, Spicher refused to answer any of the 142 questions posed to her during a deposition regarding Young's lawsuit. Among these questions were several regarding Spicher's whereabouts on June 4, 2010, and her contact with Terri that day. She also declined to identify a photo of Kyron, whether she had met him and whether she knew his father, Kaine.

During testimony provided by Kaine in a separate hearing the same year, he stated that police had told him they "have more probable cause to think Terri Horman was involved in Kyron's disappearance than they did two years ago." On July 30, 2013, it was announced that Young had dropped the lawsuit against Terri so as not to interfere with the ongoing police investigation.

Depiction in media

Terri appeared as a guest on Dr. Phil in 2016, during which she told Phil McGraw: "I was advised from the beginning by law enforcement, by my husband at the time, by attorneys in the beginning, not to say anything. I've always wanted to. I've asked multiple times to speak out and have not been allowed." She denied having any involvement in Kyron's disappearance, and also stated her belief that he was kidnapped, adding: "There was a man in a white pickup truck, Ford, parked on Highway 30 at the 7-Eleven, which is not near the school. He was acting very strangely and he was addressed by one of the employees because he had been pacing back and forth in front of the 7-Eleven for about an hour."

Boy Missing: The Search for Kyron Horman, written by Rebecca Morris, was released in May 2020.

"Vanished from School," season 2, episode 2, of the television show Real Life Nightmare on Discovery ID explores the case. The episode aired November 15, 2020.

See also
 List of people who disappeared
 List of kidnappings

References

External links

Kyron Horman flyer at the Federal Bureau of Investigation
Kyron Horman at The Charley Project
Kyron Horman news articles at The Oregonian
Terri Horman interview on Dr. Phil, September 2016

2010 in Portland, Oregon
2010s missing person cases
June 2010 crimes in the United States
Missing American children
Missing person cases in Oregon